Providence Friars ice hockey may refer to either of the ice hockey teams that represent Providence College:

Providence Friars men's ice hockey
Providence Friars women's ice hockey